Richard Dereham may refer to:

Richard Dereham (Cambridge), List of chancellors of the University of Cambridge
Sir Richard Dereham, 3rd Baronet (1644–c. 1710) of the Dereham baronets

See also
Dereham (surname)